Martens Peak is a rock peak in the northeastern part of the Ford Nunataks, in the Wisconsin Range of the Horlick Mountains, Antarctica. It was mapped by the United States Geological Survey from surveys and U.S. Navy air photos, 1960–64, and was named by the Advisory Committee on Antarctic Names for Edward A. Martens, a radioman with the winter party at Byrd Station in 1960 and at McMurdo Station in 1965.

References

Mountains of Marie Byrd Land